On Our Worst Behavior is the debut album by American band Immature, released on September 22, 1992 on Virgin Records. It is also the only album to feature former member, Don "Half-Pint" Santos, who was replaced by Kelton "LDB" Kessee. Rapper Megan Thee Stallion sampled the song ''Is It Love This Time" for her song "Big Ole Freak" from her second EP Tina Snow.

Track listing 
"Funky Psychtro Enterview" (2:39)
"You're All That" (5:01)
"Mom's Illin'" (Forty Oz. Edit) (0:26)
"Honey Dip" (3:22)
"Anti Splurgian Girl" (0:04)
"Be My Girl" (4:30)
"Let Me Hmm Hmm Hmm" (4:16)
"Da Munchies" (4:30)
"I Wanna Know You That Way" (3:29)
"(Good Things) Come to Those Who Wait" (3:38)
"Meet Me Outside" (4:02)
"Tear It Up (On Our Worst Behavior)" (3:25)
"Is It Love This Time" (4:28)
"Wiser Than My Years" (5:21)

Singles
Tear it Up (On Our Worst Behavior)Release date: August 28, 1992
Da MunchiesRelease date: December 7, 1992
A1 Da Munchies [12" Truck Diesel] 5:40
A2 Da Munchies [12" Truck Diesel Club Dub] 4:05
A3 Da Munchies [12" Mix #2] 6:24
B1 Da Munchies [7" Diesel No Crossover Radio Mix] 4:10
B2 Da Munchies [7" Diesel Mix Without Rap] 3:34
B3 Da Munchies [LP Version] 4:24

Additional personnel
Raquel McQueen (vocals)
Blueblood
LROC
Mixzo (various instruments)
Christopher Troy (piano, keyboards, drums)
Chris Stokes (keyboards)
Cyrus Melchor (keyboards, programming)
Charles Norris (keyboards, drum programming)
Kuk Harrell
Chris "Tricky" Stewart (drums, keyboards)
Marquis "Hami" Dair
Jermaine Dupri (programming, keyboards)
Dionne Farris
Brandy Diggs (background vocals).

References

1992 debut albums
IMx albums
New jack swing albums
Virgin Records albums
Albums produced by Jermaine Dupri
Albums produced by Kuk Harrell